Italy at the Athletics World Cup (from 2010 known as IAAF Continental Cup) participated at the 1981 IAAF World Cup, because it was the host nation and on the other occasions participated as part of the Europe team.

Participation as nation

Medals
The Italian athletes competed in Europa team (with the exception of 1981 IAAF World Cup in which they participated as a nation).

See also 
Italy national athletics team
Italy at the Athletics European Cup

References

External links 
 IAAF World Cup and Continental Cup Statistic Handbook
 IAAF WORLD CUP IN ATHLETICS (from 1977 to 2002)

World Cup
Nations at athletics (track and field) competitions